The Teatro Filarmonico is the main opera theater in Verona, Italy, and is one of the leading opera houses in Europe. The Teatro Filarmonico is property of the Accademia Filarmonica di Verona. Having been built in 1716, and later rebuilt after a fire of January 21, 1749, and again after the allied bombing of February 23, 1945.

History
Verona needed an opera house, so the Accademia Filarmonica di Verona decided in the early 18th century to build a theatre worthy and large. Work began in 1716 and lasted 13 years. Finally, inauguration was on the evening of January 6, 1732, with the pastoral drama La fida ninfa by Antonio Vivaldi, a libretto by Scipio Maffei. 
The opera season became famous, and the performances led society events. But on January 21, 1749, fire eventually spread in the theatre. Rebuilt, the theater was re-dedicated in 1754 with the opera Lucio Vero by Neapolitan composer Davide Perez. The opera had a limited success. Corsican in the 18th century, during the French invasion, a long series of celebrations were held in the theater, such as the Cantata per la Santa Alleanza ("Cantata for the Holy Alliance") of Gioachino Rossini. The theater hosted international singers, and among its repertoire appear the most famous works of Italian and foreign melodrama.

On the tragic night of February 23, 1945, the theater collapsed under the Anglo-American bombing. The Academy Philharmonic announced that it would try to rebuild the theatre exactly as it had been before. The proceedings lasted a long time: the theatre was inaugurated again in 1975, with the opera Falstaff by Antonio Salieri.

The theatre still hosts opera, ballets and concerts seasons. The operatic repertoire is one of the most famous for Italian operas and international (La sonnambula, The Barber of Seville, Tosca ...) and the works of non-repertoire (A day of the kingdom, Manon Lescaut of Auber, Loreley of Catalani ...).

See also
Accademia Filarmonica di Verona

Opera houses in Italy
Buildings and structures in Verona
Music venues completed in 1716
Music venues completed in 1754
Music venues completed in 1975
Tourist attractions in Verona
Theatres in Veneto
Theatres completed in 1716
Theatres completed in 1754
Theatres completed in 1975
1754 establishments in the Republic of Venice
1716 establishments in Italy
18th-century architecture in Italy